Sven Seidel (born 1973/74) is a businessman, CEO of the Lidl supermarket chain, from March 2014 to February 2017, when he was succeeded by Jesper Højer.

Prior to his appointment as CEO, Seidel had been head of corporate development for over three years. He was previously a partner at Porsche Consulting.

References

1970s births
Living people
German chief executives